Baloul is a village in the Boumerdès Province in Kabylie, Algeria.

Location
The village is surrounded by Soumâa and the town of Thenia in the Khachna mountain range.

Notable people

References

Villages in Algeria
Boumerdès Province
Kabylie